Sex and Society is a non-profit organization in Denmark which is responsible for providing sex education in the country. Due to Denmark's birthrate being under the replacement rate since the 1970s, in recent years the organization's focus has shifted from providing information on contraception to encouraging people to have children.

References 

Non-profit organizations based in Denmark
1956 establishments in Denmark
Family planning